Sowar Ditto Ram of the Central India Horse (21st King George Vs. Own Horse), Indian Armoured Corps, in the Indian Army during World War II was posthumously awarded the George Cross for his gallantry in helping a wounded comrade on 23 July 1944 in the vicinity of Monterchi (Perugia province) in Italy.    Notice of his award was published in The London Gazette of 13 December 1945.  Ditto Ram, who was also known as Ram Ditto, was born in Gehrota, Gurdspur in India.

Citation

Memorials
Ram's name is inscribed on the Memorial Gate with other Commonwealth George Cross awardees form World War II, and on the Cassino Memorial. A plaque in Piazza Umberto I in Monterchi town centre commemorates Sowar Ditto Ram GC, Lt St. J. Graham Young GC and Sowar Niru Chand, all fallen in the same minefield near Casa Tocci.

References

Indian recipients of the George Cross
1944 deaths
Indian Army personnel killed in World War II
Year of birth missing